Griffin is an unincorporated community in Christian County, in the U.S. state of Missouri.

History
A post office called Griffin was established in 1886, and remained in operation until 1907. The community was named after the proprietor of a nearby mill.

References

Unincorporated communities in Christian County, Missouri
Unincorporated communities in Missouri